Pessicus (also known as Canonicus II and Mosomp and Maussup and Quissucquansh and Sucquans and Wemosit) (c. 1623–1676) was a Narragansett Indian leader who was killed during King Philip's War.

Pessicus was born around 1623 to Mascus and had an older brother Miantonomo.  In 1643 after the Mohegans killed Miantonomo, Pessicus became the Narragansetts' co-sachem along with his uncle Canonicus, and the next year the tribe submitted to the authority of the British crown. Despite opposition from the Commissioners of the United Colonies Canonicus and Pessicus sought to retaliate against the Mohegan tribe for the death of Miantonomo.  In 1647 Pessicus became the sole sachem of the Narragansetts after Canonicus' death, although Ninigret weakened his authority.  At the outbreak of King Philip's War Pessicus sought a peaceful resolution, but eventually fled Narragansett territory in the spring of 1676 and the Mohawks killed him near Piscataqua shortly later, by June of that year.
The village of Moosup in the town of Plainfield, Connecticut, and the river and associated river valley that flows from Rhode Island to the Quinnebaug River in CT, are named after Maussup.

References

1623 births
1676 deaths
17th-century Native Americans
Native American leaders
Pre-statehood history of Rhode Island
People of colonial Rhode Island
King Philip's War
Narragansett people
Native American history of Rhode Island